U2 are an Irish rock band from Dublin.  The band formed in 1976 and released their debut EP Three in 1979 exclusively in Ireland.  Following the release of their single "Another Day" in 1980, U2 signed a recording contract with Island Records, and released their first album, Boy, later that year. The band has since released 14 studio albums, the most recent being Songs of Experience in 2017. To date, U2 has released 436 songs.

Songs

Notes

References
Footnotes

Bibliography

External links 
U2 Lyrics by Title – U2.com
U2 by Song Title – U2Wanderer.org

 
U2